Anthony Lefroy (1800 – 12 January 1890) was an Irish Conservative Party MP in the United Kingdom Parliament.

He was born in Dublin, the eldest son of politician and jurist Thomas Langlois Lefroy, was educated at Trinity College and studied law at the King's Inns (1820) and Lincoln's Inn (1822).

He was MP for Longford from 1830 to 1832, and again from 1833 to 1837 (he lost the seat at the 1832 general election and was returned after an election petition). He returned to the seat in 1842–1847, when he was declared elected after a petition challenging the result of the 1841 general election. He was appointed High Sheriff of Longford for 1849–50. He then represented his father's old seat, the University constituency of Dublin University, from 1858 to 1870.  In 1870 he accepted the Chiltern Hundreds and left Parliament.

He died at Carrickglass in 1890. He had married the Hon. Jane King, daughter of Robert King, 1st Viscount Lorton. They had one son, who predeceased him, and two daughters. His estates passed to his brother, Thomas, who himself died the next year.

References
 Who's Who of British Members of Parliament: Vol. I 1832-1885, edited by Michael Stenton (The Harvester Press 1976)

External links
 

1800 births
1890 deaths
Alumni of Trinity College Dublin
Members of Lincoln's Inn
Irish Conservative Party MPs
Members of the Parliament of the United Kingdom for County Longford constituencies (1801–1922)
Members of the Parliament of the United Kingdom for Dublin University
Politicians from County Dublin
UK MPs 1830–1831
UK MPs 1831–1832
UK MPs 1832–1835
UK MPs 1835–1837
UK MPs 1841–1847
UK MPs 1857–1859
UK MPs 1859–1865
UK MPs 1865–1868
UK MPs 1868–1874
High Sheriffs of Longford
Alumni of King's Inns